Cremella is a comune (municipality) in the Province of Lecco in the Italian region Lombardy, located about  northeast of Milan and about  southwest of Lecco. 

Cremella borders the following municipalities: Barzago, Barzanò, Bulciago, Cassago Brianza.

References

External links
 Official website